Stillman is a surname. Notable people with the surname include:

People
Al Stillman (1906–1979), American lyricist
Ary Stillman (1891–1967), Russian-American painter
Bruce William Stillman (born 1953), Australian biochemist and molecular biologist
Charles Stillman (1810–1875), American business magnate and founder of Brownsville, Texas; father of James Stillman, grandfather of James Stillman Rockefeller
Cory Stillman (born 1973), Canadian professional ice hockey player
Ellicott R. Stillman (1844–1911), American politician
Fredrik Stillman (born 1966), retired Swedish ice hockey player
George Stillman (1921–1997), American painter
George S. Stillman (1879–1907), American football player
Major Isaiah Stillman (1793–1861), American soldier
James Stillman (1850–1918), American industrialist and banker, son of Charles Stillman
James Stillman Rockefeller (1902–2004), American Olympic rower and businessman, son of James Stillman and grandson of Charles Stillman
John Stillman (architect) (born 1920), British architect
John Robert Stillman (1946–2009), American actor
Lou Stillman (1887–1969), aka Louis Ingber, boxing trainer
Marie Spartali Stillman (1844–1927), painter of Greek descent
Michael Stillman (born 1957), American mathematician
Mimi Stillman (born 1982), American classical flutist
Norman Stillman (born 1945), professor of Judaic history
Patrick M. Stillman, retired Rear Admiral of the United States Coast Guard
Paul Roscoe Stillman, (1871–1945) clinical researcher in periodontology
Richard J. Stillman II, professor of public administration
Riley Stillman (born 1998), Canadian ice hockey player
Stacey Stillman (born 1972), American reality television participant on Survivor: Borneo
Whit Stillman (born 1952), American writer-director
William James Stillman (1828–1901), American painter, journalist, and photographer

Fictional characters
Lucy Stillman, a fictional character in the Assassin's Creed video game series